The Ernst Barre Private Brewery is a brewery in the East Westphalian town of Lübbecke in the north-western German district of Minden-Lübbecke. It was founded by Ernst Johann Barre in 1842. Along with its immediate competitor, the Herforder Brauerei, it is one of the largest breweries in East Westphalia (based on beer production), and is thus of regional importance. The brewery is located at the southern end of the pass over the Wiehen Hills (Bundesstrasse 239) between Lübbecke and Hüllhorst, at the base of the Reineberg hill, and has been in the same family for generations.

History and regional importance

The brewery not only supports numerous festivals in the region, but it has even founded a festival of its own, the Bierbrunnenfest (Beer Fountain Festival), which has been celebrated in Lübbecke since 1954. Incredibly, this involves serving thousands of litres of beer to the general populace - at no charge whatsoever. Barre Bräu is not just popular in the Lübbecker Land, but also further north on the North German Plain, and in the district of Herford, to the south of Lübbecke.

Barre Bräu is also exported to Taiwan and China.

Barre Bräu is brewed in accordance with the purity law (Reinheitsgebot) of 1516, and the brewery is a founding member of the Die Freien Brauer (Independent Brewers) initiative, an association of medium-sized private breweries in Germany and Austria. According to its own sources, Barre Bräu produced  of beer during 2010, which is just over 2% of the annual output of Germany's largest brewery. However, Barre Bräu has a reputation for quality and operates very successfully in its niche market.

Products 

Barre produces numerous types of beer and shandy:

 Barre Pilsener
 Barre Frey Bier (non-alcoholic)
 Barre Dunkel
 Barre Alt
 Barre Weizen
 Barre Maibock
 Barre Alt Schuss (Alt Bier + malt beer)
 Barre Alster (beer shandy)
 Barre Lemon (beer shandy)
 Barre Festbier
 Barre Weizen Grape (beer shandy)
 Barre Fass Brause (non-alcoholic)

Barre Maibock is only available in spring; all other types are sold year-round.

Features 
The brewery runs its own museum, Barre's Brauwelt (Barre's Brewing World). The museum opened its doors in 2001, and is the only one of its kind in Ostwestfalen-Lippe. The impressive sandstone-and-brick building housing the museum was among the first to be built when the brewery was established, and it was used as a brewing and storage cellar until the mid-1980s. The exhibit shows a complete production facility, including numerous carefully restored brewing machines and tools used in beer making, and gives a good overview of the brewery's history. Experienced guides provide visitors with interesting information about the art of beer brewing during the 19th and 20th centuries. The brewery's products can subsequently be sampled in the adjacent restaurant.

Slogans
"Barre Bräu dein Herz erfreu!" (loosely translated as "May Barre Bräu please your heart!"); "Mit Gebirgsquellwasser gebraut" (brewed with mountain spring water); "Aus Norddeutschland's ältester Pilsbrauerei" (from northern Germany's oldest Pilsner brewery).

References

External links
 Barre's Brauwelt
 Life in Barre-Land, past and present

Breweries in Germany
Beer in Germany
Companies based in North Rhine-Westphalia
Minden-Lübbecke
Lübbecke